Bubas bubalus is a species of beetle of the subfamily Scarabaeinae within the family Scarabaeidae. It is widespread in central and northern Spain, southern France, Portugal, Gibraltar, Monaco and Italy. The species could also be found on the Balearic Islands. They like a temperate climate. Adults are found in manure from October to July.

References

Scarabaeidae
Beetles of Europe
Beetles described in 1811